

Draw

External links
Association of Tennis Professionals (ATP) draw

2006 Abierto Mexicano Telcel
Abierto Mexicano Telcel